Duanesburg Airport  is a privately owned, public use airport in Schenectady County, New York, United States. It is located near Duanesburg, a hamlet in the Town of Duanesburg. This airport is included in the National Plan of Integrated Airport Systems for 2011–2015, which categorized it as a general aviation facility.

Facilities and aircraft 
Duanesburg Airport covers an area of 30 acres (12 ha) at an elevation of 714 feet (218 m) above mean sea level. It has one runway designated 10/28 with an asphalt surface measuring 2,600 by 45 feet (792 x 14 m).  It is also home to the Duanesburg Skydiving Club. 

For the 12-month period ending September 21, 2011, the airport had 800 aircraft operations, an average of 66 per month: 75% general aviation and 25% military.

References

External links 
 Duanesburg Airport (4B1) at NYSDOT Airport Directory
 Aerial image as of May 1995 from USGS The National Map
 

Airports in New York (state)
Transportation in Schenectady County, New York